Paramanuchitchinorot (or ; also spelt Paramanujita Jinorasa, Paramanujit Jinoros, etc.; 11 December 1790 – 9 December 1853) was a Buddhist writer and a prince of the Chakri dynasty. One of his well-known epic poems is Lilit Taleng Phai. In 1851 he was appointed the Supreme Patriarch of the Rattanakosin kingdom and remained in that position until his death.

Life
Prince Wasukri was a child of King Rama I and Lady Chui, born at the Grand Palace he was the king's twenty-eight child. In 1802, he became a Samanera or novice monk at the age of 12 years old, eight years later he was ordained a Bhikkhu monk. As a monk he resided at Wat Pho and studied to become a religious scholar there. He was also learned in the Khmer and Pali languages. In 1812 he was made the abbot of the temple.

King Rama III, who was his nephew, frequently called upon him to write, translate, and compile books. During his reign the king gave his uncle the ecclesiastical rank equivalent to that of a deputy patriarch, in which he was put in charge of all the temples within Bangkok. The prince abbot was also a prolific poet and composed many religious and sacred verses. Many of these verse were made into inscriptions which can be found all over Wat Pho today, making the temple a place of worship and a place of learning.

In 1851, the new monarch, King Rama IV, appointed the abbot as the Supreme Patriarch of the kingdom, and he was given the official title Phra Chao Boromawong Ther Krom Phra Paramanuchitchinorot. Unfortunately, this honour was briefly held, as he died on 9 December 1853. His body lay in state for a full year before his cremation.

His residence at Wat Pho, Tamnak Wasukri, also called the poet's house, was built by Rama III as a gift, it is open once a year on his birthday.

On 12 April 1921, in the reign of King Rama VI an additional title was created to denote his status as both a royal prince and patriarch of the kingdom. From then on he was known posthumously as Somdet Phra Maha Samana Chao Krom Phra Paramanuchitchinorot.

References 

Supreme Patriarchs of Thailand
Thai poets
Buddhist poets
1791 births
1852 deaths
Thai Buddhist monks
18th-century Chakri dynasty
19th-century Chakri dynasty
Thai male Phra Ong Chao
People from Bangkok
Thai male writers
19th century in Siam
19th-century non-fiction writers
19th-century poets
Male non-fiction writers
Sons of kings